The Sport Buffet is a sports talk radio show originating out of Orlando, Florida.  It began in 2007 as a Saturday morning show on Orlando's ESPN.  Throughout its duration, it has been hosted by Matt West.  Matt's style is very Socratic. He commonly states, "Let's look at this from a global perspective."  While seemingly knowledgeable about many sports, he is best when he is trying to relate some sports activity to every day life.  He doesn't talk a lot about his personal life, but he speaks glowingly about his wife.  He also has a son and two daughters.  His eating prowess has been the subject of many segments over many months of the show.

WHOO Era 
When the show originated on WHOO, it was produced by Jared Lawrence, who has come back and visited when the show was regionally syndicated.  Later, it was produced by Ryan Bonifant, who was also a regular contributor.  During this period, there was a heavy emphasis on Orlando Sports.  Jason Lucas, an official employee of the Orlando Predators of the now defunct Arena Football League came on several times.  Further, there was a heavy emphasis on the Orlando Magic, as Pat Williams (NBA), Dwight Howard, and JJ Redick all came on the show.

Regionally Syndicated Era 
In June 2008, the show expanded to include additional stations.  Some of those stations have been St. Augustine's ESPN WAOC, Pensacola's Sports leader WTKE, Clemson's Sports Leader WCCP-FM, The Space Coast's ESPN WINT, and inexplicably Live 101.9 WBGE.  Upon this initial expansion, Ballpark Frank produced the show and spoke when asked a direct question.  After he left the show, a "Producer for the Day" who spoke sparingly, took over producing duties.  While the moniker might suggest differently, he was on several times, and the host and co-hosts have made jokes about this.  After that brief period, a female producer who only spoke over the "loud speaker" during the Sampler Platter.  She seems to be the voice on the show's intro also.  A female identified as "Suzannah, captain of the Non-Men" has recently been identified as the producer.  During this era, the co-host became the Iceman.  He is bombastic and likes to make up multi-syllabic words.  His love for all teams Boston has been made known on several occasions.

Podcast Based Era 
In 2013, the show moved to podcasts in lieu of live radio.  Matt became known as "The Phat Man" and the Iceman was also revealed to be Aaron Crouch.  They now use real names and sobriquets interchangeably.  Since this format took over, they have had very few experts on the air, and they invite people, like Dave, Mike, Andrew, or Jacob on for the entire segment.  They put out an hour-long podcast sometime early Wednesday morning, and they create 1-2 "samplers" during the week that are 10-20 minutes and include some relevant topic that falls between Wednesdays.

Other Voices on the Air 
Steve "DIVA" Chapman and David "Tex" Poston both served as co-host with regularity.  The two of them have rarely been on together, but when they were, some of the most memorable moments of the show have occurred.  Each co-host has a nemesis.  Tex's nemesis is "Dimarco" and the DIVA's nemesis is "Bishop Felipe".  Each nemesis had a turn co-hosting the show.  In addition to these nemeses, Steve Atwater, Mac Rogers, Marc Ryan, and Bret Brilliante have co-hosted once or twice.

The DIVA came within a 9-iron of being a professional golfer.  He was a semi-pro level basketball player.  He commonly laughs at Matt's jokes, even when they aren't funny.  He also has invited at least 5-6 callers and emailers to join them in the studio.  Tex commonly uses the bathroom during the show and, apparently, always wears Cologne.  He gives out pictures of himself for winning a contest.  He claims to have dated an underwear model and be an ambidextrous tennis player.

The show solicits calls and emails.  With the exception of several calls during football season, the show gets a large amount of email and not as many phone calls.  Whenever a new station is added, Matt signifies this by calling Coach Atwater.  Coach Atwater has never appeared except on these initial shows.  Since the move to podcasts, emails have not been read.  To date, it is not certain if they are still soliciting them, but clearly they are not soliciting them to the same degree as they were.

Segments 
Every week, Matt does a Sampler Platter, which is where he does a fast-paced briefing on a variety of sports topics, in the first segment.
Until February 2009, Tex did a segment called the Wisdom of Tex, where he would give his take on 3-4 issues.  When he served as a co-host, this segment was often skipped.
Until April 2009, Tex also had a mid-month hit list, which once a month, he asked several boneheads "What Were You Thinking?"
Through the Summer of 2008, there was a music contest, where the listeners got to choose a "theme song" for the DIVA.  It is believed that this contest is where Steve became known as the DIVA.
During Football season, Steve Chapman conducts a segment called "The DIVA's Fantasy of the Week" where he gives Fantasy Football advice.

"Experts" who come on frequently 
Steve Atwater-Scout and Farm League Coach
Chuck Waltz-Golf Expert
Mac Rogers-NHL Expert
Josh Allen-MLB Expert, Baseball Historian
Lou DiPietro-NFL draft
Bradley Warren-College Football
Justin Barney-NBA, College Basketball
Greg Batten-Outdoors, pop culture
Gregg Kielma-NASCAR, NHRA
James Raia-Tour de France
Jason Lucas-Arena Football (defunct)
Billy Osborn-NASCAR, other car (former)
The Goober Brothers-NHL Expert (former)
Jorge Caravia-NFL draft expert (former)

External links 
 http://www.TheSportBuffet.com - The show's official website

American sports radio programs
ESPN Radio programs
2000s American radio programs
American talk radio programs